Slobodishchevo is a rural locality (a village) in Chuchkovskoye Rural Settlement, Sokolsky District, Vologda Oblast, Russia. The population was 21 as of 2002.

Geography 
Slobodishchevo is located 87 km northeast of Sokol (the district's administrative centre) by road. Gorbovo is the nearest rural locality.

References 

Rural localities in Sokolsky District, Vologda Oblast